Laurenti's five-toed skink (Leptosiaphos hylophilus) is a species of lizard in the family Scincidae. It is found in Zaire.

References

Leptosiaphos
Reptiles described in 1982
Taxa named by Raymond Laurent
Endemic fauna of the Democratic Republic of the Congo